Tenaturris trilineata is a species of sea snail, a marine gastropod mollusk in the family Mangeliidae.

Description
The length of the shell attains 6.5 mm.

The shell is narrowly shouldered and contains 6½ whorls. It shows small, close, numerous longitudinal ribs and impressed revolving striae. Its color is whitish, with three narrow brown bands, one of which appears on the spire whorls. The outer lip is thick. The sinus is deep. The siphonal canal is very short.

Distribution
T. trilineata can be found in Atlantic and Caribbean waters, ranging from the Campeche Bank to Colombia and the Virgin Islands.; in the Caribbean Sea, the Gulf of Mexico and the Lesser Antilles.

References

 Adams, Charles Baker. "Specierum novarum conchyliorum." Jamaica repertorum, synopsis. Proceedings of the Boston Society of Natural History 2.1 (1845): 17.
 Rosenberg, G., F. Moretzsohn, and E. F. García. 2009. Gastropoda (Mollusca) of the Gulf of Mexico, pp. 579–699 in Felder, D.L. and D.K. Camp (eds.), Gulf of Mexico–Origins, Waters, and Biota. Biodiversity. Texas A&M Press, College Station, Texas.

External links
 G.W. Tryon (1884) Manual of Conchology, structural and systematic, with illustrations of the species, vol. VI; Philadelphia, Academy of Natural Sciences
 
 
 De Jong K.M. & Coomans H.E. (1988) Marine gastropods from Curaçao, Aruba and Bonaire. Leiden: E.J. Brill. 261 pp. 

trilineata
Gastropods described in 1845